The Encyclopædia Britannica First Edition (1768–1771) is a 3-volume reference work, an edition of the Encyclopædia Britannica. It was developed during the encyclopaedia's earliest period as a two-man operation founded by Colin Macfarquhar and Andrew Bell, in Edinburgh, Scotland, and was sold unbound in subscription format over a period of 3 years. Most of the articles were written by William Smellie and edited by Macfarquhar, who printed the pages. All copperplates were created by Bell.

The Britannica was the idea of Colin Macfarquhar, a bookseller and printer, and Andrew Bell, an engraver, both of Edinburgh. They conceived of the Britannica as a conservative reaction to the French Encyclopédie of Denis Diderot (published 1751–1766), which was widely viewed as heretical. The Encyclopédie had begun as a French translation of the popular English encyclopedia, Cyclopaedia published by Ephraim Chambers in 1728. Although later editions of Chambers' Cyclopaedia were still popular, and despite the commercial failure of other English encyclopedias, Macfarquhar and Bell were inspired by the intellectual ferment of the Scottish Enlightenment and thought the time ripe for a new encyclopedia "compiled upon a new plan". 

Needing an editor, the two chose a 28-year-old scholar named William Smellie who was offered 200 pounds sterling to produce the encyclopedia in 100 parts (called "numbers" and equivalent to thick pamphlets), which were later bound into three volumes. The first number appeared on 10 December 1768 in Edinburgh, priced sixpence or 8 pence on finer paper. The Britannica was published under the pseudonym "A Society of Gentlemen in Scotland", possibly referring to the many gentlemen who had bought subscriptions. By releasing the numbers in weekly installments, the Britannica was completed in 1771, having 2,391 pages. The numbers were bound in three equally sized volumes covering Aa–Bzo, Caaba–Lythrum, and Macao–Zyglophyllum; an estimated 3,000 sets were eventually sold, priced at 12 pounds sterling apiece.

The First Edition also featured 160 copperplate illustrations engraved by Bell. Some illustrations were shocking to some readers, such as the three pages depicting female pelvises and fetuses in the midwifery article; King George III commanded that these pages be ripped from every copy.

The key idea that set the Britannica apart was to group related topics together into longer essays, that were then organized alphabetically. Previous English encyclopedias had generally only listed related terms separately in their alphabetical order, rather like a modern technical dictionary, an approach that the Britannica management derided as "dismembering the Sciences". Of this new organisational plan, Smellie wrote that the Encyclopaedia Britannica "...is better calculated to answer all the purposes of a Dictionary of Arts & Sciences than any hitherto published". Although anticipated by Dennis de Coetlogon, the idea for this "new plan" is generally ascribed to Colin Macfarquhar, although Smellie claimed it as his own invention.

Smellie wrote most of the first edition, borrowing liberally from the authors of his era, including Voltaire, Benjamin Franklin, Alexander Pope and Samuel Johnson. He later said:

The vivid prose and easy navigation of the first edition led to strong demand for a second. Although this edition has been faulted for its imperfect scholarship, Smellie argued that the Britannica should be given the benefit of the doubt:

Smellie strove to make Britannica as usable as possible, saying that "utility ought to be the principal intention of every publication. Wherever this intention does not plainly appear, neither the books nor their authors have the smallest claim to the approbation of mankind". On the occasion of the 200th anniversary of the 1st edition, Encyclopædia Britannica Inc. published a facsimile of the 1st edition, even including "age spots" on the paper. This has been periodically reprinted and is still part of Britannica's product line.

Critics branded it the "Gospel of Satan" and doctors denounced the Britannica as they resented its undermining of their authority.

References

External links 
 Encyclopædia Britannica, or, A dictionary of arts and sciences, compiled upon a new plan ; in which the different sciences and arts are digested into distinct treatises or systems, and the various technical terms, etc. are explained as they occur in the order of the alphabet / by a Society of Gentlemen in Scotland ; illustrated with one hundred and sixty copperplates.  [Chicago: Encyclopædia Britannica, 1979?] Facsimile of the 1st ed.: Edinburgh : Printed by A. Bell and C. Macfarquhar and sold by Collin Macfarquhar, 1771. at HathiTrust
 	Encyclopaedia Britannica: or, A Dictionary of Arts and Sciences, Compiled Upon a New Plan, in Which the Different Sciences and Arts Are Digested Into Distinct Treatises or Systens, and the Various Technical Terms, &c. Are Explained As They Occur in the Order of the Alphabet Edinburgh: Printed for A. Bell and C. Macfarquhar, 1771. Full color scans at the National Library of Scotland
Encyclopaedia Britannica: or, A Dictionary of Arts and Sciences, Compiled Upon a New Plan, in Which the Different Sciences and Arts Are Digested Into Distinct Treatises or Systens, and the Various Technical Terms, &c. Are Explained As They Occur in the Order of the Alphabet 	first edition reprint, 3 volumes; London: Printed for J. Donaldson, 1773

 Searchable copy on google books: Volume 1, Volume 2.

01
1768 books
1768 in Scotland
18th-century encyclopedias